Tiger Love is the only solo album by Bronx-born American soul singer and background vocalist Ray Simpson, released on Warner Bros. Records in 1978. Produced by Ashford & Simpson, it features the songs, "Slinky" and "My Love Is Understandin'".

Track listing
All tracks composed Bobby Gene Hall, Jr. and Ray Simpson; except where indicated
 "Tiger Love" - 	4:12 	
 "Slinky" -	4:32 	
 "Good Naughty Night" - 	4:29 	
 "No One's Satisfied" -	5:21 	
 "Give It Up" - 	3:48 	
 "You're The One" (John Davis) -	3:00 	
 "I Never Thought I'd Fall in Love" -	4:21 	
 "My Love Is Understandin'" -	5:56

Personnel and production

 Arranged by Ashford & Simpson, John Davis, William Eaton (rhythm); John Davis (strings, horns)
 Backing vocals – Ashford & Simpson, Ray Simpson, Ullanda McCullough
 Bass – Francisco Centeno, Vince Fay
 Congas, Percussion – Larry B. Washington, Ralph MacDonald
 Drums – Jimmy Young, John Susswell
 Guitar – Bobby Gene Hall, Jr., Craig Snyder, Hugh McCracken, Keith L. Loving*, Ronnie James
 Keyboards – Arthur Jenkins, John Davis, Pat Rebillot, Valerie Simpson
 Synthesizer [Moog] – Ray Chew

References

External links

1978 debut albums
Albums produced by Ashford & Simpson
Warner Records albums